Aessosporon is a genus of Basidiomycota found in the family Sporidiobolaceae. It contains the two species Aessosporon dendrophilum and Aessosporon salmonicolor.

References

External links

Basidiomycota genera
Sporidiobolales